Pedro León is Spanish footballer.

Pedro León may also refer to:
 Pedro León Gallo (1779–1852), Argentine statesman
 Pedro León Gallo Goyenechea (1830–1877), Chilean politician
 Pedro León Zapata (1929–2015), Venezuelan artist
 Pedro Pablo León (born 1943), Peruvian footballer
 Pedro María León-Páez y Brown (1835–1903), Costa Rican politician
 Pedro León Torres, Venezuelan independence hero
 Pedro Jiménez León (born 1958), Mexican politician
 Pedro Cieza de León (1520–1554), conquistador of Peru
 Pedro Ponce de León (1520–1584), Spanish monk
 Pedro León (baseball)